Joan Geelvinck (Amsterdam, 7 August 1737 - Amsterdam, 2 July 1802) was, in 1787, mayor of Amsterdam for scarcely six months.  He came to offices after two Orangist mayors were ejected in a radical way.  Hendrik Daniëlsz Hooft, the father of Joan's brother-in-law, was the leader of the Amsterdam Patriots in the vroedschap.

1737 births
1802 deaths
Members of the Dutch Patriots faction
Mayors of Amsterdam
Joan